Michael Pedersen is a New Hampshire politician.

Education
Pedersen earned a B.S in electronic engineering technology from the Wentworth Institute of Technology.

Career
On November 6, 2018, Pedersen was elected to the New Hampshire House of Representatives where he represents the Hillsborough 32 district. Pedersen assumed office on December 5, 2018. Pedersen is a Democrat. Pedersen endorsed Amy Klobuchar in the 2020 Democratic Party presidential primaries.

Personal life
Pedersen resides in Nashua, New Hampshire. Pedersen is widowed and has three children.

References

Living people
Wentworth Institute of Technology alumni
Politicians from Nashua, New Hampshire
Democratic Party members of the New Hampshire House of Representatives
21st-century American politicians
Year of birth missing (living people)